AKB0048 is a 2012 anime television series produced by Satelight based on the entertainment group, AKB48. Set in the distant future, where many planets have been put under entertainment bans, AKB0048, a group of successors to the original AKB48, travel across the galaxy to provide hope to these planets whilst fighting off the anti-entertainment force, DES. The series follows a group of understudies who train to become the next group of successors. The first season aired in Japan between April 29, 2012 and July 22, 2012. The second season aired between January 5, 2013 and March 30, 2013.

Episode list

AKB0048 (2012)

AKB0048: Next Stage (2013)

Music
Opening Theme
Kibō ni Tsuite by NO NAME (Mayu Watanabe, Sayaka Nakaya, Amina Sato, Haruka Ishida, Kumi Yagami, Sumire Satō, Sawako Hata, Mao Mita, Karen Iwata) (Season 1)
Aruji Naki Sono Koe by NO NAME (Season 2)
Ending Theme
Yume wa Nando mo Umarekawaru by NO NAME (Season 1)
Kono Namida wo Kimi ni Sasagu by NO NAME (Season 2)
Insert Song
Aitakatta by AKB48 (Episode 1, 3, 8, 9, 21)
Shōjotachi yo by AKB48 (Episode 1, 15)
AKB Sanjō! by AKB48 (Episode 2, 17)
Beginner by AKB48 (Episode 3, 8, 15, 16)
Ponytail to Shushu by AKB48 (Episode 3, 16, 19)
Heavy Rotation by AKB48 (Episode 4, 9, 17, 18, 21)
Shonichi by AKB48 (Episode 4, 14, 16)
Lemon no Toshigoro by Sumire Satō & Haruka Ishida (Episode 4)

References

AKB0048